Elliott House, also known as Chester County Log Cabin, is a historic home located near Richburg, Chester County, South Carolina. It was built about 1770, and is a two-story, late 18th to early 19th century log dwelling. The house features a tall shed-roofed porch across the front, a steeply pitched gable roof, an end chimney, stone piers, and dovetailed log joints. The interior floors and ceilings are original heart pine.

It was listed on the National Register of Historic Places in 1971.

References

Log houses in the United States
Houses on the National Register of Historic Places in South Carolina
Houses completed in 1770
Houses in Chester County, South Carolina
National Register of Historic Places in Chester County, South Carolina
1770 establishments in South Carolina
Log buildings and structures on the National Register of Historic Places in South Carolina